= Synodic =

Synodic, may refer to:

- Synodic day
- Synodic month
- Synodic orbital period, synodic year or synodic time, the time of a celestial object reappearing in relation two other objects
